Choice Is Yours is the third mini album by the Japanese entertainers AAA. It only features the male members of AAA. It was released on avex trax on June 18, 2008, in three different editions: CD, CD accompanied by a Live DVD and CD accompanied by DVD.

It charted at #10 on the Oricon album chart.

CD track listing
 Crash 	
 Hasta la vista ~アスタ・ラ・ビスタ~ 	
 ZAPPER (Shuta Sueyoshi and Mitsuhiro Hidaka duet)
 Crying Freeman (Shinjiro Atae solo)	
 BET 	
 あきれるくらいわがままな自由  (Akirerukurai Wagamama na Jiyuu)

DVD track listing

Live DVD
Winter Special Live~Otoko dakedato ... kounarimashita !~(2007/12/6 Club CITTA Kawasaki)Recorded

DVD
Winter Special Live~Otoko dakedato ... kounarimashita !~ at Club CITTA on December 6

Hasta la vista  ~Asuta ra bisuta~ 
Soul Edge Boy
Crash
Akirerukurai Wagamama na Jiyuu
Chewing Gum
Saikyou Babe (Chibikko AAA version)
Get Chu! (Acoustic version)
Bomb A Head!
Saikyou Babe
-ENCORE-
No End Summer
BET
Winter lander! (AAA men's version)

References 

AAA (band) albums
2008 EPs
2008 live albums
2008 video albums
Live video albums
Avex Group live albums
Avex Group EPs
Avex Group video albums
Japanese-language EPs
Live EPs